The Red Masquerade Ball (German: Die rote Redoute) is a 1921 German silent film directed by Hanns Kobe and starring Rudolf Forster, Marija Leiko and Ressel Orla.

Cast
 Rudolf Forster
 Marija Leiko
 Ressel Orla
 Paul Rehkopf
 Hermann Vallentin

References

Bibliography
 Rolf Giesen. The Nosferatu Story: The Seminal Horror Film, Its Predecessors and Its Enduring Legacy. McFarland, 2019.

External links

1921 films
Films of the Weimar Republic
Films directed by Hanns Kobe
German silent feature films